Keys for Kids Ministries, formerly known as Children's Bible Hour and CBH Ministries, is a Christian media ministry organization that produces radio programs (such as Down Gilead Lane), print materials, and web-based media for evangelism to children. From 1944 to 1999 Children's Bible Hour was the flagship production, and then from 2001 to 2009 the radio drama Down Gilead Lane. Starting in 1989, the programs were featured on the Children's Sonshine Network, later His Kids Radio, and since 2014, known as Keys for Kids Radio. Longtime host and director, Charlie VanderMeer, known as Uncle Charlie, died in 2019.

References

External links

Christian mass media companies
Christian missions
Radio production companies